Shaara is a surname. Notable people with the surname include:

Michael Shaara (1928 - 1988), American writer of science fiction, sports fiction, and historical fiction
Jeffrey Shaara (born 1952), American novelist